Changuinola is a city in the Bocas del Toro Province of Panama and seat city of the Changuinola District. The city attracts tourists as a popular gateway to Bocas Town and nearby cities Almirante and Chiriqui Grande.
Changuinola is surrounded by Changuinola River and extensive banana plantations.

Demographics
Its population as of 1990 was 33,721; its population as of 2000 was 39,896.

Climate
Changuinola is a coastal location with a tropical climate, more specifically a trade-wind tropical rainforest climate.  The area does not have a predictable dry season. The driest times are late August to mid-October, February, and March. Changuinola is humid. Thundershowers and heavy rain are common. Normal temperatures are consistent all year (Hi: 80°-84 °F, low: 71°-75 °F). Due to its low latitude, sunrise is around 6 AM, and sunset is around 6 PM local time. These times vary slightly during the year. Weather data is collected at Capitán Manuel Niño International Airport.

Transportation

Changuinola is accessible by air, land, or sea. Visitors can fly into Capitán Manuel Niño International Airport from Panama City by Air Panama. It has daily flights but can be delayed due to frequent thunderstorms and heavy rains. Direct flights from the United States, Canada, and Mexico are not available.

Buses run between Changuinola, Almirante, David and Panama City. When traveling by land, tourists coming from or going to Costa Rica must clear both Costa Rican customs in Sixaola and Panamanian customs in Guabito. Buses are more reliable in bad weather.

Infrastructure

Changuinola is divided into small farm communities called "Fincas", since all of the city is surrounded by banana plantations. as example, "Finca 4" which means Farm 4.

Changuinola has one main road that crosses all town from south to north, at the end you could take left to reach Guabito border town.

The "Manuel Niño" International Airport is a small international airport where you can take flights to Panama City.

The Calvin Byron Stadium for is located in El Empalme neighborhood, home of Bocas del Toro baseball team.

The Changuinola River bridge was built in 2009 and replaced 1920 railroad bridge next to it.

Changuinola was struck in April 1991 by 7.7 powerful earthquake, the town was reconstructed in the following years.

Public Services
Private and Public health care available. The CSS Changuinola Hospital is located right next to the Police station, and private clinics are also a great choice and available in the city.

Changuinola has several public and private schools, to mention most important IPT Changuinola and Empalme School.

University of Panama extension "CRUB" is located in Empalme, Changuinola

References

External links
Tropic river woods
Portal of Changuinola
Weather Underground: Changuinola, Panama (not Costa Rica).

Populated places in Bocas del Toro Province
Corregimientos of Bocas del Toro Province